Alfredo F. Olivera (9 March 1908 – unknown) was a Uruguayan chess player, five-time Uruguayan Chess Championship winner (1937, 1944, 1947, 1957, 1963).

Biography
From the late 1930s to the mid-1960s, Alfredo Olivera was one of Uruguayan leading chess players. He was multiple participant in the Uruguayan Chess Championships, where he won champion title in 1937, 1944, 1947, 1957, and 1963. Also Alfredo Olivera was participant of a number of major international tournaments: Montevideo (1938, 1939, 1941, 1953, 1956, 1959), Mar del Plata (1948, 1956, 1958), Hollywood (1945), Atlántida (1960).

Alfredo Olivera played for Uruguay in the Chess Olympiads:
 In 1939, at reserve board in the 8th Chess Olympiad in Buenos Aires (+10, =0, -5),
 In 1966, at third board in the 17th Chess Olympiad in Havana (+5, =5, -10).

Famous Danish chess grandmaster Bent Larsen spoke about Olivera as «cosy fatboy, who for many years won the Uruguayan Championship whenever he participated».

References

External links

Alfredo Olivera chess games at 365chess.com

1908 births
Year of death missing
Uruguayan chess players
Chess Olympiad competitors
20th-century chess players